Neil Cole is an actor and presenter.

Neil Cole may also refer to:

Neil Cole (politician)
Neil Cole (racing driver)
Neil Cole (firefighter) in 2013 New Year Honours

See also
Neil Coles, golfer
Cole (surname)